Chamelaucium, also known as waxflower, is a genus of shrubs endemic to south western Western Australia. They belong to the myrtle family Myrtaceae and have flowers similar to those of the tea-trees (Leptospermum). The most well-known species is the Geraldton wax, Chamelaucium uncinatum, which is cultivated widely for its large attractive flowers.

Description
Plants of the genus Chamelaucium are woody evergreen shrubs ranging from 15 cm (6 in) to 3 m (10 ft) high. The leaves are tiny to medium-sized and arranged oppositely on the stems. They contain oil glands and are aromatic, often giving off a pleasant aroma when crushed. The flowers are small and have five petals, ten stamens, and are followed by small hardened fruit.

Taxonomy
The genus was first defined by French botanist René Louiche Desfontaines in 1819. The derivation of the name is unclear. They are commonly known as waxplants, or wax flowers from the waxy feel of the petals. Fourteen species are currently recognised within the genus. It gives its name to a number of closely related genera, collectively known as the Chamelaucium alliance within the family Myrtaceae; larger members include Verticordia, Calytrix, Darwinia, Micromyrtus, Thryptomene and Baeckea.

Species
Species include:
Chamelaucium axillare F.Muell. ex Benth. – Esperance waxflower 	
Chamelaucium brevifolium Benth.  	
Chamelaucium ciliatum Desf.  	
Chamelaucium confertiflorum Domin  	
Chamelaucium drummondii (Turcz.) Meisn.  	
Chamelaucium gracile F.Muell.  
Chamelaucium heterandrum Benth.  
Chamelaucium marchantii Strid  
Chamelaucium megalopetalum F.Muell. ex Benth – large waxflower 
Chamelaucium micranthum (Turcz.) Domin  	
Chamelaucium pauciflorum (Turcz.) Benth.  	
Chamelaucium uncinatum Schauer – Geraldton waxflower, Geraldton wax	
Chamelaucium virgatum Endl.

Distribution and habitat
Restricted to the southwest of Western Australia, Chamelaucium species grow most commonly in heathland communities growing on sand near the coast or inland, and in granite outcrops. Some grow in more semi arid climates.

Cultivation
In cultivation, they do well in dryer climates with good drainage and sunny aspect. They are hardy to frost and drought, although sensitive to Phytophthora cinnamomi. The best known and most widely cultivated member of the genus by far is C. uncinatum, which is widely grown in gardens across Southern Australia, and for the cut flower industry in the USA and Israel.

References

 
 Wilson, Peter G., O'Brien, Marcelle M., Gadek, Paul A., and Quinn, Christopher J. 2001. "Myrtaceae Revisited: A Reassessment of Infrafamilial Groups". American Journal of Botany 88 (11): 2013–2025. Available online (pdf file).

 
Myrtaceae genera
Taxa named by René Louiche Desfontaines
Endemic flora of Southwest Australia